Vanishing island refers to any permanent island which is exposed at low tide but is submersed at high tide. Vanishing islands occur globally. There are vanishing islands in the Philippines and several in the San Juan Islands.

In early times, seamen were confused by this phenomenon and invented explanations for it, usually involving a massive sea monster that would let a crew land on its back before submersing itself, drowning the crew. Notable examples of these include the aspidochelone, Fastitocalon, Jasconius, Lyngbakr, Hafgufa, and various accounts of the kraken. 

There is a vanishing island off the west coast of Samal Island in the Philippines.

See also
 Tidal island

References

Islands by type
Tides